Matt Towe (born 7 January 1988) is a former English professional ice hockey forward who last played for the Belfast Giants in the EIHL, having re-signed with the club for a second time on a short-term deal in September 2016. This was then extended for the duration of the 2016-2017 season after then-head coach Derrick Walser was impressed with his performance. He previously played for the Guildford Flames in the English Premier Ice Hockey League.

Towe retired from the sport in 2019.

References

External links

1988 births
Living people
Sportspeople from Sheffield
Belfast Giants players
Cardiff Devils players
English ice hockey forwards
Guildford Flames players
Peterborough Phantoms players
Sheffield Scimitars players
Sheffield Steelers players
Braehead Clan players